The Sauer S 1800 is a family of German four-stroke aircraft engines, certified according to JAR 22-H (CS-22 subpart H)

Design and development
The engine is based on the Volkswagen air-cooled engine, extensively modified for aircraft use and all the parts are custom made. They are certified according to CS-22 subpart H  and can therefore be used in motorgliders and light aircraft that are certified as CS-VLA and CS-LSA

Variants
Sauer S 1800-1-ES1
Sauer S 1800-1-ES1C
Sauer S 1800-1-RS1

Applications
AMS Carat

Specifications

See also
Sauer Engines

References

External links
 

S1800